The ACT Book of the Year is an annual prize of $10,000 awarded for a literary work of fiction, nonfiction or poetry written by an author from the Australian Capital Territory. The award was inaugurated in 1993 with $5,000 prize money.

Winners

References

External links
 Official website
 Libraries ACT website

Australian literary awards
Awards established in 1993
Culture of the Australian Capital Territory
Australian literature-related lists